Charlton is a rural locality in the Toowoomba Region, Queensland, Australia, located  west from the Toowoomba city centre off the Warrego Highway.

Geography 
The Western railway line marks the northern boundary of the locality, while the southern boundary roughly follows Dry Creek. The higher of the two peaks of Gowrie Mountain (674 metres above sea level) is in the far west of the locality while the second lower peak (630 metres above sea level) is in the neighbouring locality of Gowrie Mountain.

The Warrego Highway passes through Charlton, with an intersection of the following road segments in the locality. To the north-east the Warrego Highway is now part of the Toowoomba Bypass, while to the east is the former Warrego Highway alignment, now known as the Toowoomba Connection Road (A21). To the south-west is the new portion of the Gore Highway (part of the Toowoomba Bypass. To the north-west is the unchanged portion of the Warrego Highway.

History 
Gowrie Estate Provisional School opened on 4 July 1898, becoming Gowrie Estate State School on 1 January 1909. In November 1915, it was renamed Charlton State School. It was located at 10834 Warrego Highway.  As at 2010, it had an enrolment of 40 children, organised into two classes (Prep-Year 3 and Years 4–7) with 6 teachers (3 full-time equivalent) and 5 non-teaching staff (2 full-time equivalent). It closed on 31 December 2013.

References

Further reading

External links 

Suburbs of Toowoomba
Localities in Queensland